Idiomelas is a genus of beetles in the family Carabidae. 

containing the following species:

 Idiomelas crenulatus (Dejean, 1829)
 Idiomelas fulvipes (Erichson, 1843)
 Idiomelas morio (Menetries, 1832)
 Idiomelas nigripes (Reitter, 1894)

References

Harpalinae
Carabidae genera